Femi Falana, SAN (born 20 May 1958)In the town of Ilawe, Ekiti State He is a Nigerian lawyer and Human right activist.He is also the father to Folarin Falana popularly known as Falz. Femi Falana is a well-known activist for human rights, always trying to show sympathy towards people.Femi Falana is well known for opposing oppression, from successive military authorities.

Education 
Femi Falana was a student of St. Michael’s School from 1963 to 1968. After finishing from this school, Femi Falana attended Sacred Heart Catholic Seminary from 1971 – 1975, He began his legal practice in 1982. After finishing his law practice in 2012, Femi Falana became a Senior Advocate in Nigeria  he graduated from the University of Ife now Obafemi Awolowo University Ile Ife Osun State. He is  a Principal Partner  at Falana&Falana Chambers which he runs with Funmi Falana his wife. He  contested and lost the governorship election of Ekiti State in 2007 on the platform of the National Conscience Party, a party he served as National Chairman in 2011.

He is the father of Falz, a popular Nigerian rapper, singer, online comedian and actor and husband to Nigerian women's rights activist Funmi Falana. He belongs to many professional bodies: West African Bar Association, Member, Nigerian Bar Association and Member, West African Bar Association, Member, Pan African Lawyers Union and Member, International Bar Association.

Publications 
He has written many publications including "Governance Politics in Post Military Nigeria Fundamental Rights Enforcement, Legaltext Publishing Company 2005.

References

1958 births
Living people
Nigerian human rights activists
20th-century Nigerian lawyers
Nigerian politicians
Senior Advocates of Nigeria
Falana family
Obafemi Awolowo University alumni
21st-century Nigerian lawyers